Poshuouinge  (pronounced "poe-shoo-wingay") is a large ancestral Pueblo ruin located on U.S. Route 84, about  south of Abiquiu, New Mexico. Its builders were the ancestors of the Tewa Pueblos who now (2011) reside in Santa Clara Pueblo and San Juan Pueblo. It has also been referred to informally as Turquoise Ruin, although there is no evidence that turquoise has ever been found in the area.

Geography
It is accessible by a United States Department of Agriculture Forest Service trail.

This city, at its largest, consisted of about 700 ground floor rooms, most being two or even three stories tall. The city was laid out with two main plazas, and a large kiva near the center of the eastern courtyard. The barrow pits of Poshuouinge were planted with small stone grids in the basement.

History
The city is believed to have been occupied between 1375 and 1475. The site was abandoned around 1500, well before Coronado and the first Europeans arrived. It is believed that its inhabitants left the banks of the Chama River and relocated nearby around the Rio Grande, where their descendants live today.

Archaeology
Adolph Bandelier excavated the area in 1885. J. A. Jeançon and his Tewa workmen unearthed tzii-wi war axes whilst excavating the site in 1919. Jeançon was said "to have interpreted the Poshuouinge shrines in light of ethnographic evidence, arguing that they represented a "world quarter system" similar to that of San Juan Pueblo."

Gallery

References

Pueblo great houses
Archaeological sites in New Mexico
Puebloan buildings and structures
Native American history of New Mexico
Ruins in the United States
Protected areas of Rio Arriba County, New Mexico
Former populated places in New Mexico
History of Rio Arriba County, New Mexico
Santa Fe National Forest
Pueblos in New Mexico